Carlos Domingo Francisco Serrano (born 22 May 1990) is a Cuban international footballer who plays for Santiago de Cuba, as a left back.

Club career
Francisco plays his club football for hometown side Santiago de Cuba.

International career
He made his international debut for Cuba in an August 2008 FIFA World Cup qualification match against Trinidad & Tobago and has, as of February 2018, earned a total of 46 caps, scoring no goals. has represented his country in FIFA World Cup qualifying matches.

References

1990 births
Living people
People from Santiago de Cuba
Association football fullbacks
Cuban footballers
Cuba international footballers
2011 CONCACAF Gold Cup players
FC Santiago de Cuba players